Governor Murphy may refer to:

Francis P. Murphy (1877–1958), 64th Governor of New Hampshire
Frank Murphy (1890–1949), 35th Governor of Michigan
Franklin Murphy (governor) (1846–1920), 31st Governor of New Jersey
Isaac Murphy (died 1882), 8th Governor of Arkansas
John Murphy (Alabama politician) (1786–1841), 4th Governor of Alabama
Oakes Murphy (1849–1908), 10th and 14th Governor of Arizona Territory
Phil Murphy (born 1957), 56th Governor of New Jersey
William Lindsay Murphy (1888–1965), Governor of the Bahamas from 1945 to 1950
Dennis Murphree (1886–1949), 42nd and 47th Governor of Mississippi